Johnny Taylor is an American painter born in 1971 in Helena, Arkansas. He received his BFA in Art History from the University of Memphis in 1996.

Overview 
Taylor paints bright colored acrylic and mixed media paintings of the memories of the heroes and the pop art/graffiti/kitsch that make up America. Johnny's work is influenced by the American humor magazine Mad and the hard rock band KISS. He uses oil, spray paint, screen printing, and stencils on canvas or wood.

Solo exhibitions

Group exhibitions

References 

20th-century American painters
1971 births
Living people
21st-century American painters